"You Could Be Mine" is a song by American rock band Guns N' Roses from their fourth studio album, Use Your Illusion II. The song was released on June 21, 1991, as the first single from the Use Your Illusion albums. The song was originally released as a song in director James Cameron's 1991 film, Terminator 2: Judgment Day. Backed with "Civil War" from Use Your Illusion II, the single reached number 29 on the US Billboard Hot 100, number three on the UK Singles Chart, and number one in Finland and Spain. It became a top-five hit in more than 10 additional countries.

History
"You Could Be Mine" was selected to be included in the James Cameron film Terminator 2: Judgment Day. Arnold Schwarzenegger had the band members over for dinner at his own home to negotiate the deal.

The lyric "With your bitch slap rappin' and your cocaine tongue you get nothin' done" from the chorus appeared on the inner sleeve of Guns N' Roses' debut album Appetite for Destruction, released in 1987 (the song had already been written by then). This "tradition" was followed by the line "Ain't It Fun" on the Use Your Illusion albums released in 1991 - two years later GN'R cover of the song "Ain't It Fun" appeared on "The Spaghetti Incident?" album. The end of first verse, "we've seen that movie too", is a reference to Elton John' song "I've Seen That Movie Too", from  the album Goodbye Yellow Brick Road. Slash states that the song's writing began at the first preproduction session for Appetite for Destruction.

The song has a one-minute drum and guitar intro. The song was played during the ending credits of Terminator 2 and is heard in the film itself in early scenes with John Connor. It also appeared in the 2009 sequel Terminator Salvation.

Song meaning and lyrics
The song talks about band member Izzy Stradlin's failed relationship with his girlfriend.

Music video
The music video for the song was directed by Andy Morahan, Stan Winston and Jeffrey Abelson. A T-800 Terminator is assembled, given the appearance of Arnold Schwarzenegger, and dispatched to assassinate the band at one of their concerts. The video consists of clips from the movie, including its teaser trailer, intercut with footage of the band performing the song as the T-800 makes his way to the front of the crowd. After the song ends, he confronts the band as they leave the venue through a back door and analyzes each member individually; Izzy Stradlin is absent at this point, replaced by keyboardist Dizzy Reed. The T-800 scans Axl Rose last and concludes that killing the band would be a "Waste of Ammo". Lowering his shotgun, he gives Rose a brief smirk and walks away.

As the video features clips from the movie, it could not be put on the DVD Welcome to the Videos due to licensing issues. The video was also not included on any of the DVD releases of Terminator 2: Judgment Day, although it was included with a special double tape edition of the film, released on VHS in 1993.

On October 6, 2022 a music video of "You Could Be Mine" song, with just a mix of scenes from the concert, live in New York at the Ritz Theatre recorded on May 16, 1991, was released to promote the Use Your Illusion (Super Deluxe Edition) box set. Approximately, from the half of the video until the end, in a few scenes, video filter are applied, to look like old film: lines, dust or scratches.

Live performances
Early live versions of "You Could Be Mine" featured Slash using a B.C. Rich Mockingbird (as in the video) instead of his usual Gibson Les Paul, due to his use of a tremolo during the solo. It was first played live at Rock in Rio II on January 20, 1991, and has been a staple ever since. The live version features amended lyrics to the line "an I leave you lyin' on the bed' with your ass in the air".

Track listings
7-inch single 
 "You Could Be Mine" (LP version) – 5:48
 "Civil War" (LP version) – 7:38

European CD single 
 "You Could Be Mine" (LP version) – 5:48
 "Civil War" (LP version) – 7:58

Personnel
 W. Axl Rose – lead vocals
 Slash – lead guitar, rhythm guitar
 Izzy Stradlin – rhythm guitar, backing vocals
 Duff McKagan – bass, backing vocals
 Matt Sorum – drums

Charts and certifications

Weekly charts

Year-end charts

Certifications

Release history

References

1991 singles
1991 songs
Geffen Records singles
Guns N' Roses songs
Music videos directed by Andy Morahan
Music videos directed by Stan Winston
Number-one singles in Finland
Number-one singles in Spain
Song recordings produced by Mike Clink
Songs written by Axl Rose
Songs written by Izzy Stradlin
Songs written for films
Terminator (franchise)